ISO 668 - Series 1 freight containers — Classification, dimensions and ratings is an ISO international standard which classifies intermodal freight shipping containers nominally, and standardizes their sizes, measurements and weight specifications.

The current version of the standard is the Seventh edition (2020), which integrates version E. The standard was prepared by Technical Committee ISO/TC 104: Freight containers, Subcommittee SC 1: General purpose containers.

Introduced in 1968, ISO 668 currently regulates both external and internal dimensions of containers, as well as the minimum door opening sizes, where applicable. Minimum internal dimensions were earlier defined by ISO standard 1894: 'General  purpose  series  1  freight  containers – Minimum  internal  dimensions'. Its second edition appeared in 1979, but was withdrawn, once revised by ISO 14961 of 1990. ISO 14961's current version is 2013, including Amendment 1 of 2016, last reviewed and reconfirmed in 2019.

ISO 668 also specifies the respective associated gross weight ratings, and includes requirements for load transfer areas in the base structures of containers, since Amendment 1 of 2005.
Amendment 2 of 2005 further added forty-five foot length containers to the standard.

The maximum gross mass (MGM) rating of twenty- and thirty-foot length units was notably increased to 30,480 kg (67,200 lbs) by Amendment 1 of 2005. Until then, the MGM for 20-foot units was 24,000 kg (52,900 lbs), and for 30-foot boxes 25,400 kg (56,000 lbs). However, since Amendment 2 of 2016, the maximum gross mass for ISO-standard Series 1 containers of all sizes, (except 10foot units), has most recently been further increased to a maximum of 36,000 kg (79,370 lbs). Draft Amendment 1 of ISO 668: 2020 – for the eighth edition – maintains this.

A separate standard is set for the  required stacking strength, or 'maximum superimposed mass' (MSM) for standard containers. The ISO standard for Series 1 containers, ISO 14961, established this, among other characteristics, for many years set at 192,000 kg (423,290 lbs). However, in order to keep pace with the increase of container maximum gross weight, the continuing growth of container-ships size, and the related height of container stacks on board the ships, the required stacking strength was increased to a superimposed weight of 213,360 kg in 2005 per Amendment 3. This value was since maintained in the latest revision of Standard 14961 (2013). Production statistics show that the vast majority of containers have, for many years, been built with a stacking strength at or above the 213,000 kg figure stipulated in ISO 14961. In fact, most major container operators and lessors now cause containers to be built above the required figure, with the most common superimposed strength being 216,000 kg.

Scope and systematic structure

The ISO 668 standard firstly classifies containers by their length in whole (imperial) feet for their 'common names', despite all measurement units used being either metric (SI), or officially based on the metric system. The exact standard length of '30-foot' and shorter containers is actually slightly shorter than their nominal length, to accommodate for the space taken up by twist-lock couplers, required for stacking containers of unequal length.

Stacking
ISO containers up to 40foot in length are only required to have stacking strength at their four corners – typically achieved through four strong, vertical (steel) corner posts. Shorter than 40foot containers must therefore be horizontally joined together rigidly (with four twist-locks between every two containers), to form a rigid combined whole of matching length to longer containers (both underneath and above them), to be stackable – supported on the four outside corners of any resulting combination.

ISO standard 668 hence defines the exact lengths of all standard container sizes on purpose in such a way that shorter containers, joined with the also standard sized twistlocks, can always form longer, combined units of an exact length, identical to that of longer containers, or other combinations, such that the corner castings will always line up on top of the four outside corners of another, longer container, or combination, for vertical connecting and securing.

However, this does not apply when stacking 40foot and 45foot containers in one stack. These can be stacked interchangeably. ISO standards require 45foot containers to include a second set of four strong vertical columns (like corner posts), manufactured in them, symmetrically at the 40foot length position (meaning  inwards from their actual outside corners), to support being stacked interchangeably with 40foot containers.

See also
ISO 6346 — standard covering the coding, identification and marking of intermodal containers

Notes

References

External links
 ISO 668:2005(E) Amendments 1 & 2 to ISO 668:1995 (attached)
 ISO 668:2013(E) Sixth edition — (pdf; archived)
 Draft amendment of eighth edition — (pdf; archived)including preview of Seventh edition ISO 668: 2020
 ISO Technical committee TC104: Freight containers

00668
ISO 00668